Clayton and Openshaw is an area and electoral ward of Manchester, England created by the Local Government Boundary Commission for England (LGBCE) replacing the previous electoral wards of Ancoats & Clayton and Bradford for the local elections 2018.

It is represented in Westminster by Lucy Powell MP for Manchester Central.

Councillors 
Two councillors currently serve the ward with one vacancy: Sean McHale (Lab), and Donna Ludford (Lab) are incumbent councillors; Kenneth Dobson (Ind) won a by-election in February 2020 but resigned in October.

 indicates seat up for election.
 indicates seat won in by-election.

Elections in 2020s 
* denotes incumbent councillor seeking re-election.

May 2021

By-election: 27 February 2020 
C

Elections in 2010s

May 2019

May 2018

References



Manchester City Council Wards